The 2019–20 Central Connecticut Blue Devils men's basketball team represented Central Connecticut State University during the 2019–20 NCAA Division I men's basketball season. The Blue Devils were led by fourth-year head coach Donyell Marshall, and played their home games at the William H. Detrick Gymnasium in New Britain, Connecticut as members of the Northeast Conference. They finished the season 4–27, 3–15 in NEC play to finish in last place. They failed to qualify for the NEC tournament.

Previous season
The Blue Devils finished the 2018–19 season, 11–20 overall, 5–13 in NEC play to finish in last place. They failed to qualify for the NEC tournament.

Roster

Schedule and results

|-
!colspan=12 style=| Exhibition

|-
!colspan=12 style=| Non-Conference Regular season

 

  

|-
!colspan=12 style=| NEC regular season

      

   

Source

References

Central Connecticut Blue Devils men's basketball seasons
Central Connecticut Blue Devils
Central Connecticut Blue Devils men's basketball team
Central Connecticut Blue Devils men's basketball team